Zimmer's tody-tyrant (Hemitriccus minimus) is a species of bird in the family Tyrannidae.

It is found in Bolivia, Brazil, Ecuador, and Peru. Its natural habitat is subtropical or tropical dry shrubland.

Its name commemorates American ornithologist John Todd Zimmer.

References

Zimmer's tody-tyrant
Birds of the Amazon Basin
Birds of the Peruvian Amazon
Zimmer's tody-tyrant
Zimmer's tody-tyrant
Taxonomy articles created by Polbot